The REM Sleep Behavior Disorder Screening Questionnaire (RBDSQ) is a specific questionnaire for rapid eye movement behavior disorder (RBD) developed by Stiasny-Kolster and team, to assess the most prominent clinical features of RBD. It is a 10-item, patient self-rating instrument with short questions to be answered by either 'yes' or 'no'. The validity of the questionnaire was studied by researchers and they have observed it to perform with high sensitivity and reasonable specificity in the diagnosis of RBD.

Use

RBDSQ has the potential to be useful as a screening instrument for neurodegenerative disorder, such as the α-synucleinopathies, Parkinson's disease or multiple system atrophy which may enable early diagnosis and also recruitment of people with RBD necessary for research studies.

Format

RBDSQ contains a set of 10 items that are to be answered by either 'yes' or 'no'. Items 1 to 4 address the frequency and content of dreams and their relationship to nocturnal movements and behavior. Item 5 asks about self-injuries and injuries of the
bed partner. Item 6 consists of four subitems assessing nocturnal motor behavior more specifically, e.g., questions
about nocturnal vocalization, sudden limb movements, complex movements, or bedding items that fell down. Items 7 and 8 deal with nocturnal awakenings. Item 9 focuses on disturbed sleep in general and item 10 on the presence of any neurological disorder. The maximum total score of the RBDSQ is 13 points.

See also
 Rapid eye movement sleep (REM sleep)
 Non-rapid eye movement sleep (NREM)

References

External links
 
 
 
 

Sleep disorders
Mental disorders screening and assessment tools
Neuropsychological tests
Medical scoring system
Parkinson's disease